Burma, now known as Myanmar, is a country in Southeast Asia.

Burma may also refer to:
 Burma (film), a 2014 Indian film
 Burma Plate, a minor tectonic plate
 Burma, Guyana, a village in Guyana
 Burma Valley, Zimbabwe
 Burma Camp, the headquarters of the Ghana Armed Forces
 Burma campaign, series of battles in World War II
 Burma (wargame), a 1975 board wargame that simulates the Burma campaign of World War II 
 B.U.R.M.A., a World War II postal acronym

See also 
 Burmah (disambiguation)
 Bruma (disambiguation)
 Nestor Burma, a fictional character from Léo Malet's crime novels
 SS Birma, 1894 ship.